Abel Vázquez Raña (born 18 October 1940) is a Mexican former sports shooter. He competed in the 50 metre rifle, three positions event at the 1964 Summer Olympics.

Notes

References

1940 births
Living people
Mexican male sport shooters
Olympic shooters of Mexico
Shooters at the 1964 Summer Olympics
Place of birth missing (living people)